Rayapur may refer to:

Rayapur, Lumbini
Rayapur, Sagarmatha